Eagle Lion 1985-2013 was an event horse that has competed at the highest level of the sport with great success. He stood  16.1 hh (169 cm).

Eagle Lion was out of the famous mare Stream Lion, a producer of excellent event horses, including stablemates Pirate Lion and Regent Lion. His Thoroughbred sire, Gipfel, stood in Germany and produced many top-class sport horses.

With Bruce Davidson in the irons, Eagle Lion won the Fairhill CCI***, the Badminton Horse Trials (making him the first of only two American horses to win the prestigious event), and has had top-five placings at Fairhill, Burghley, and other attempts at Badminton. Between 1990 and 1998, the horse gained 1277 points.

There is now a bronze sculpture of the horse with his rider. Artist Jean Clagett depicted the pair jumping over the "Head of the Lake" obstacle at the Rolex Kentucky Three Day. The sculpture was mounted at the Kentucky Horse Park during the 2007 Rolex Three Day.

Eagle Lion is one of the few horses (if not the only horse) to complete the 4-star course at Badminton double clean (no jump penalties, no time penalties) four times.

Eventing record
2001
 10th Rolex Kentucky Three Day CCI**** 
 3rd North American Beaulieu Classic HT (Advanced)

2000 
 7th Rolex Kentucky Three Day CCI**** 
 1st Morven Park Spring H.T. (Advanced)
 1st Pine Top Farm Spring HT (Advanced)
 9th Basingstoke Farms H.T. (AI)

1998
 3rd Badminton Horse Trials CCI**** 
 6th Beaulieu North American Classic H.T. (Advanced)
 7th Morven Park Spring H.T. (Advanced)

1997 
 11th Burghley Horse Trials CCI*** 
 8th Badminton Horse Trials CCI**** 
 14th Beaulieu North American Classic H.T. (Advanced) 
 1st Morven Park Spring H.T. (Advanced)

1996
 3rd Fair Hill International Three-Day Event 3S 
 7th Morven Park H.T. (Advanced)
 22nd Beaulieu North American Classic H.T. (Advanced) 
 14th Morven Park Spring H.T. (Advanced)
 14th Sharpton Winter H.T. HT (Intermediate)

1995
 1st Badminton Horse Trials 3D CCI**** 
 12th Beaulieu North American Classic H.T. (Advanced)  
 4th Morven Park Spring H.T. (Advanced)

1994
 4th Badminton Horse Trials CCI****

1993
 4th Burghley Horse Trials CCI***

1992
 1st Fair Hill International Three-Day Event 3S 
 2nd Pleasant Hollow Farms Inc. H.T. (Advanced)
 4th Fair Hill H.T. (Advanced)
 1st Loudoun Hunt P.C. Spring H.T. (Intermediate)

1991
 8th Radnor Hunt International Three-Day Event 2S 
 1st Fair Hill H.T. (Intermediate)
 6th Millbrook Equestrian Center H.T. (Intermediate)
 4th Groton House Farm H.T. (Intermediate)
 4th Fair Hill May H.T. (Intermediate)

1990
 7th Ledyard Farm 3-Day Event 1S 
 2nd Millbrook Equestrian Center H.T. (Preliminary)
 3rd Pleasant Hollow Farms, Inc. H.T. (Preliminary)  
 1st Somerset Hills H.T. (Preliminary)

External links
Eagle Lion's pedigree
Eagle Lion Picture

Eventing horses
1985 animal births